The Men's 60 metres 1A was one of the events held in Athletics at the 1976 Summer Paralympics in Toronto.

There were 10 competitors in the heat; 6 made it into the final.

Mexican athlete Juan Almaraz won the gold medal ahead of his fellow Mexican, Francisco de las Fuentes.

Results

Heats

Final

References 

Athletics at the 1976 Summer Paralympics